Leonardo's self-propelled cart is an invention designed by Leonardo da Vinci, considered the ancestor of the modern automobile.

Info
The machine is powered by two symmetric springs. While one spring would be enough to move the device, two symmetric springs probably looked like a more "logically perfect" solution. Leonardo had been well aware that the powering force provided by the springs drops significantly when they unwind. In order to deliver smooth and stable motion, the machine features a balance wheel, as used in clocks. The control mechanism is quite complex and allows it to follow a pre-programmed path automatically. The machine also features a mechanism similar to a differential that in addition allows the turning angle to be set.

A replica of the self-propelled cart is kept at the museum Clos Lucé, near Château d'Amboise, in France. The television show Doing DaVinci also made a replica in 2009.

See also
 Atlantic Codex
 Science and inventions of Leonardo da Vinci

References

External links
 Self-Propelled Cart
  Il carro automotore

Leonardo da Vinci projects